Steven Kaplan may refer to:

Steven Kaplan (economist) (born 1959), American professor at the University of Chicago Booth School of Business
Steven Kaplan (historian), French historian at Cornell University
Steven Kaplan (Pennsylvania official), Pennsylvania politician
Steven G. Kaplan (born 1962), American film and television producer
Steven H. Kaplan (born 1953), American professor of English and president of the University of New Haven
Steve Kaplan (basketball), American-Israeli player on the Israel national basketball team
Steve Kaplan (entrepreneur) (born 1960), American entrepreneur, author, public speaker
Steve Kaplan (professor) (born 1953), American professor of African studies
Steven Kaplan, actor in the 2009 film Bart Got a Room

See also
 Stephen Kaplan (disambiguation)